Nils Elowsson (23 October 1890 – 27 October 1999) was a Swedish politician and journalist. He was born in Kristianstads län, Sweden and died in Kristianstad at the age of 109.

Career
Elowsson began his career as a journalist in 1917, and eventually became the editor of the Swedish newspaper Läns-Demokraten in 1932. The newspaper was closed down in 1957. He was a party member of socialdemokraterna and a member of the Parliament Riksdag 1940-1963 (24 years). At the age of 89 he became the author of a book called Det var på snapphanens tid. At the time of his death, four days after his 109th birthday, he was the oldest living man in Sweden.

References

1890 births
1999 deaths
Swedish politicians
Swedish centenarians
Men centenarians